The 1930 Texas Mines Miners football team was an American football team that represented Texas School of Mines (now known as the University of Texas at El Paso) as an independent during the 1930 college football season. In its second season under head coach Mack Saxon, the team compiled a 7–1–1 record and outscored opponents by a total of 186 to 67.

Schedule

References

Texas Mines
UTEP Miners football seasons
Texas Mines Miners football